James Jeffrey Barker (born 6 November 1892 in Ilkeston, England, died 18 October 1947 in Birmingham, England) was a British track and field athlete who competed in the 1912 Summer Olympics.

In 1912 he ran in the first round of the 100 metres competition, but failed to advance.

Achievements
Midland Countries
100 yards winner 1911–14 and 1919
220 yards winner 1913 and 1914
AAA Championships
100 yards second to Willie Applegarth 1913
Meeting in Berlin 1913
100 metres winner, beating Victor d'Arcy and Applegarth

Personal bests
100 yards – 10.2 (1913)
100 metres – 10.9 (1913)
220 yards – 23.4 (1913)

References

Buchanan, Ian: Who's Who of UK & GB International Athletes 1896-1939
British Olympic Association, Athletes: James Barker.
 Bergvall, Erik (ed.) (1913). in Adams-Ray, Edward (trans.).:  The Official Report of the Olympic Games of Stockholm 1912. Stockholm: Wahlström & Widstrand. 
 De Wael (2000): 60. James Barker 
 Wudarski (last update 2006): page 4: heat XV James J. Barker 

1892 births
1947 deaths
British male sprinters
Olympic athletes of Great Britain
Athletes (track and field) at the 1912 Summer Olympics
English male sprinters
People from Ilkeston
Sportspeople from Derbyshire